The Guelph Indians were a Canadian junior ice hockey team in the Ontario Hockey Association from 1936 to 1940. After four seasons of play, the Guelph Biltmore Hat Company became the team's sponsors, and the team changed names to the Guelph Biltmore Mad Hatters. Guelph's best season was 1937–38, when they played in the OHA championship series for the J. Ross Robertson Cup, but lost to the Oshawa Generals.

NHL alumni
Seven alumni from the Guelph Indians later played in the National Hockey League.

Adam Brown
Eddie Bush
Harry Dick
Lloyd Finkbeiner
John Holota
Alan Kuntz
Joe Turner

Yearly results
Season-by-season results.

References

Defunct Ontario Hockey League teams
Sport in Guelph
1936 establishments in Ontario
1940 disestablishments in Ontario
Ice hockey clubs established in 1936
Ice hockey clubs disestablished in 1940